Johnson v. Guzman Chavez, 594 U.S. ___ (2021), was a United States Supreme Court case related to immigration detention.

Background 

The respondents in this case were deported by the federal government and later reentered the country, claiming asylum. They then sought release from detention via bond hearings. The district court sided with their claims, and the United States Court of Appeals for the Fourth Circuit affirmed, over the dissent of Judge Julius N. Richardson. The federal government filed a petition for a writ of certiorari.

Supreme Court 

Certiorari was granted on June 15, 2020. The Supreme Court held oral arguments on January 11, 2021. On June 29, 2021, the Supreme Court reversed the Fourth Circuit, holding that the respondents were not entitled to bond hearings for release.

References

External links 
 

2021 in United States case law
United States Supreme Court cases
United States Supreme Court cases of the Roberts Court
United States immigration and naturalization case law